Roßtal Wegbrücke station is a railway station in the municipality of Roßtal, located in the Fürth district in Bavaria, Germany. The station is on the Nuremberg–Crailsheim line of Deutsche Bahn.

References

Railway stations in Bavaria
Buildings and structures in Fürth (district)
Nuremberg S-Bahn stations